Isetsky District  is an administrative district (raion), one of the twenty-two in Tyumen Oblast, Russia. As a municipal division, it is incorporated as Isetsky Municipal District. It is located in the west of the oblast. Its administrative center is the rural locality (a selo) of Isetskoye. Population: 26,061 (2010 Census);  The population of Isetskoye accounts for 28.7% of the district's total population.

Geography
Isetsky District is located in the southwest of Tyumen Oblast, on the border with Kurgan Oblast and Sverdlovsk Oblast.  The terrain is flat plain with a forest-steppe landscape.  It is in the basin of the Iset River, which meanders from west to east through the middle of the district.  The Iset meets the south-north flowing Tobol River about 20km east of the district.  The administrative center is the town of Isetskoye, which is in the middle of the district at the intersection of a north-south highway ("Tyumen-Kurgan") and a west-east highway ("Yekaterinburg-Shadrinsk-Isetskoye-Yalutorovsk").

Isetsky District is 40 km south of the city of Tyumen, 260 km east of the city of Yekaterinburg, and 1,650 km east of Moscow.  The area measures 60 km (north-south), 60 km (west-east); total area is 2751 km2 (about 0.003% of Tyumen Oblast).

The district is bordered on the north by Tyumensky District and Yalutorovsky District, on the east by Uporovsky District, on the south and west by Shatrovsky District of Kurgan Oblast, and on the northwest by Tugulymsky District of Sverdlovsk Oblast.

History
The area has been inhabited since prehistoric times, with the oldest artifacts dated to the Mesolithic (7th-8th century BCE).  In fact, a notable feature of the area is the extensive series of archaeological sites that run through the Iset River area.  Over 500 archaeological sites, representing Stone, Bronze and Iron Age settlements, and others through the Middle Ages, have been mapped into a historic region known collectively known as the Ingala Valley.

The first settlers from Russia arrived in 1650 as part of a military line of defensive forts, including one on the Iset River.  Early activity centered on the military uses, but also an early a monastery and a prison.  In the 1700s, the fertile agricultural soil attracted colonists from central Russia, and woodworking industries developed around the timber and water-power resources.  The first bridge across the Iset River in the district was specially constructed in 1837 for the drive-through visit of the Grand Duke Alexander Nikolayevich (the future Alexander II of Russia).

The area was part of Tobolsk Province from 1650 to 1738, but was merged into Isetsky Orenburg Province in 1738, and then in 1782 into Yalutavorsk Province until 1923.

Isetsky District was officially formed in November 1923 as part of the Ishimsky district of the Ural Region. After a brief move to Chelyabinsk region in 1934 and then to Omsk Oblast for 1934-1944, the district was finally transferred to Tymen Oblast in 1944.

See also
 Ingala Valley

References

Sources

Districts of Tyumen Oblast